José Carlos Martínez Navas (born 10 October 1997), is a Guatemalan professional football player who plays for Liga Nacional club Municipal and the  Guatemala national team.

Career
He debuted internationally in a friendly against Cuba national football team in a 3–0 victory.

In 2019, he was called up to the Guatemala U22 team for the World Youth Festival Toulon.

On 5 September 2019, Martínez scored his first goal for the senior team against Anguilla in a 10–0 victory in the CONCACAF Nations League.

International goals
Scores and results list Guatemala's goal tally first.

Honours
Municipal 
Liga Nacional de Guatemala: Clausura 2017, Apertura 2019

References

1997 births
Living people
Guatemalan footballers
Association football forwards
C.S.D. Municipal players
Guatemala international footballers